Una storia semplice may refer to:
 Una storia semplice (novel), a 1989 novel by Leonardo Sciascia 
 Una storia semplice (film), a 1991 film directed by Emidio Greco
 Una storia semplice (album), a 2012 album by Italian band Negramaro